Shin Ye-eun (born January 18, 1998) is a South Korean actress, best known for her role in the web series A-Teen and its sequel A-Teen 2. She also starred in the television series He Is Psychometric, Welcome, More Than Friends, The Glory and Revenge of Others.

Early life
Shin is currently attending Sungkyunkwan University and majors in Performing Arts.

Career

Shin appeared as the cover model for Korea's college magazine College Tomorrow 840 in 2017. She made her debut shortly after as an actress in the 2018 web series A-Teen. In August 2018, Shin signed with JYP Entertainment; she subsequently appeared in labelmate Day6's "Shoot Me" music video.

In 2019, Shin landed her first lead role in the fantasy television series He Is Psychometric, where she starred opposite Park Jin-young. She also reprised her role as Do Ha-na in the second season of A-Teen. From July 2019 to July 2020, she hosted the music program Music Bank with Golden Child's Choi Bo-min.

In 2020, she starred in KBS2's Welcome alongside Kim Myung-soo.

In 2021, she featured in the song "La Rosa" from U-Know's second mini album, Noir, which was released on January 18, 2021. Starting from November 2021, she joined the radio show Volume Up as a DJ after Kang Han-na's withdrawal.

In 2022, Shin made a special appearance in the original TVING drama Yumi's Cells 2. Later in July, she joined the Bubble for Actors platform. Later in November, Shin appeared in the drama Revenge of Others, which aired on the Disney+ platform.

Discography

Singles

Filmography

Film

Television series

Web series

Television shows

Hosting

Music video appearances

Radio shows

Promotional ambassador

Awards and nominations

References

External links

 
 
 

 

1998 births
Living people
People from Sokcho
South Korean female models
South Korean television actresses
South Korean television presenters
South Korean women television presenters
South Korean web series actresses
21st-century South Korean actresses
JYP Entertainment artists
Anyang Arts High School alumni